Syntomidopsis variegata is a moth in the subfamily Arctiinae. It was described by Francis Walker in 1854. It is found on Jamaica.

References

Moths described in 1854
Arctiinae